Middle College may refer to:
 Middle College Program
 Middle College High School (disambiguation)
 Dr. Wright L. Lassiter Jr. Early College High School, formerly "Middle College", in Dallas, Texas
 Middle College for Technology Careers, Houston, Texas